Ekanite is an uncommon silicate mineral with chemical formula  or . It is a member of the steacyite group. It is among the few gemstones that are naturally radioactive. Most ekanite is mined in Sri Lanka, although deposits also occur in Russia and North America.  Clear and well-colored stones are rare as the radioactivity tends to degrade the crystal matrix over time in a process known as metamictization.

The type locality is Eheliyagoda, Ratnapura District, Sabaragamuwa Province, Sri Lanka, where it was first described in 1955 by F. L. D. Ekanayake, a Sri Lankan scientist, and it is named after him.

In Sri Lanka the mineral specimens occur as detrital pebbles. In the Tombstone Mountains of Yukon, Canada, the mineral is found in a syenitic glacial erratic boulder. In the Alban Hills of Italy it is found in volcanic ejecta.

References

1955 introductions
Calcium minerals
Gemstones
Phyllosilicates
Radioactivity
Ratnapura District
Tetragonal minerals
Minerals in space group 97
Thorium minerals